Bill Andriette is an American journalist and pro-pedophile activist.

Biography
Andriette was the Art Director for the LGBT periodical Baltimore Outloud, and was previously the Features Editor of The Guide, a gay travel and entertainment magazine published in Boston. As of 1996, he was the spokesman of the North American Man/Boy Love Association (NAMBLA).

In an interview in The Boston Phoenix in 1996, Andriette said, "I realized I was gay when I was 12." He  joined NAMBLA when he was 15 years old, and by the age of 17 he was a member of the Steering Committee. For six years he was the editor of the NAMBLA Bulletin. He expressed differences with some earlier NAMBLA directors' views regarding legalization of what is now considered to be statutory rape, finding room for compromise with government and societal concerns. He expressed frustration that the LGBT rights movement had ostracized NAMBLA, because he regarded the moral condemnation of pedophiles as a "reactionary ideology which the gay movement has happily adopted to burnish its own particular identity category."

During the 1993 International Lesbian and Gay Association (ILGA) controversy, he defended NAMBLA's membership in ILGA, and to a greater extent NAMBLA's place in the gay rights movement, by claiming that the main tradition' of homosexuality" is consistent with supporting the abolition of laws prohibiting statutory rape.

He appeared in the 1994 documentary about NAMBLA, Chicken Hawk: Men Who Love Boys, in which described how his work with NAMBLA provided an outlet for his sexual attraction to prepubescent young boys below the age of consent.

In 2008, he was a runner up for a Sex Positive Journalism Award (Sexies) for an article which appeared in The Guide: "Tipping Point for Gay Sex?"

Selected writings

References

External links 

"Another Moral Panic" from the Subversity series. Daniel Tsang interviews Bill Andriette on KUCI radio June 15, 1999. Press release

1965 births
20th-century American non-fiction writers
21st-century American non-fiction writers
American male journalists
Cornell University alumni
American gay writers
American LGBT journalists
American LGBT rights activists
Living people
Pedophile advocacy
Writers from Boston
20th-century American male writers
21st-century American male writers
21st-century American LGBT people